Hypotia mavromoustakisi is a species of snout moth in the genus Hypotia. It was described by Rebel in 1928, and is endemic to Cyprus and Israel.

References

Moths described in 1928
Hypotiini